The House on the Dune (French: La maison dans la dune) is a 1932 novel by the French writer Maxence Van Der Meersch. It portrays the battle between smugglers and customs officials along the French-Belgian border.

Adaptations
It has been turned into films on three occasions:
 The House on the Dune (1934 film), a French film directed by Pierre Billon 
 The House on the Dune (1952 film), a French film directed by Georges Lampin 
 The House on the Dune (1988 film), a Belgian film directed by Michel Mees

References

Bibliography
 Philip Mosley. Split Screen: Belgian Cinema and Cultural Identity. SUNY Press, 2001.

1932 French novels
French novels adapted into films
French crime novels